The Botanical Garden of University of Trás-os-Montes and Alto Douro is a botanical garden established in 1988. It is located within the campus of the University of Trás-os-Montes and Alto Douro (UTAD), in Vila Real, Portugal, and has an interpretive centre for visitors.

Collections 
The Botanical Garden includes 15 thematic collections:
Plants from the Douro Valley
Mediterranean plants from acidic, siliceous soils
Mediterranean plants from alkaline, calcareous soils
Ericaceae
Ancient plants, including Magnoliaceae and Metasequoia glyptostroboides
Cistaceae and Fabaceae
Fagaceae
Myrtaceae
Wild fruits
Medicinal and aromatic herbs
Ground cover plants
Forestry plants
Ornamental conifers
Vitaceae
'The Ages of Mankind', a collection dedicated to the changes in vegetation that occurred during Human evolution, as well as ethnobotany and domestication. This collection is dedicated to Lady Jane Renfrew and José Alves Ribeiro.

References

Botanical gardens in Portugal